Justin D'John Simon (born May 6, 1996) is an American professional basketball player for Scaligera Verona of the LBA. He played college basketball for St. John's.

High school career
Simon spent the first three years of his high school career at Temecula Valley High School in his hometown of Temecula, California. In his junior season, Simon averaged 17.5 points, 8.9 rebounds, and 4.2 assists per game, which earned him spots on the all-state underclass and the Division II all-state first teams, in addition to being named the Southwestern League MVP. He also received an invitation to the Men's U-18 National Team training camp.

Simon spent his senior season at Brewster Academy in Wolfeboro, New Hampshire, where he blossomed into a consensus top-40 national recruit in the class of 2015. In leading the team to a 34–1 record, the NEPSAC Class AAA title and the National Prep Championship, Simon averaged 12.5 points, 5.0 rebounds, and 3.5 assists per game.

Recruiting
Simon finished high school as a four-star recruit and the 37th ranked player in the class of 2015, according to ESPN. Simon received over 20 Division I scholarship offers from the likes of Indiana, Kansas, and Louisville, but ended up selecting Arizona.

|}

College career

Arizona
In his freshman season at Arizona, Simon struggled to find playing time. Early in the season, Simon received an increased amount of minutes due to Allonzo Trier being injured, but his time on the court soon fell off as he failed to see the court in seven of the team's last 11 games. Simon did not start in a game all season and saw action in just 24 contests. In 7.5 minutes per game, Simon averaged 2.3 points and 1.2 rebounds per game. 

After the season, Simon announced his intention to transfer. He had interest from several programs, including Oklahoma State, Providence, and New Mexico, but ended up choosing St. John's.

St. John's
Simon sat out the 2016-17 season due to NCAA transfer rules.

Simon had a breakout sophomore season, tallying 20 double-digit scoring performances and nine double-doubles in 33 games, all of which he started. He averaged 12.2 points, 7.1 rebounds, 5.1 assists, and 2.5 steals per game, and was the only player in the Big East to rank in the top five in rebounding, assists, and steals. Simon ranked eighth nationally in steals per game with 82.

In his junior season, Simon's offensive production declined slightly but he developed into one of the nation's best defenders. In 34 games, 33 of which he started, Simon averaged 10.4 points and 5.1 rebounds all while leading the team in blocked shots with 22 and ranking third on the team in steals with 50. After the season, Simon was named Big East Defensive Player of the Year.

On April 9, 2019, Simon announced he was forgoing his senior season to declare for the 2019 NBA Draft.

Statistics
 

|-
| style="text-align:left;"| 2015–16
| style="text-align:left;"| Arizona
| 24 || 0 || 7.5 || .500 || .333 || .429 || 1.2 || .3 || .3 || .3 || 2.3
|-
| style="text-align:left;"| 2017–18
| style="text-align:left;"| St. John's
| 33 || 33 || 36.1 || .473 || .417 || .661 || 7.1 || 5.1 || 2.5 || .8 || 12.2
|-
| style="text-align:left;"| 2018–19
| style="text-align:left;"| St. John's
| 34 || 33 || 32.9 || .462 || .289 || .608 || 5.1 || 3.2 || 1.5 || .6 || 10.4
|- class="sortbottom"
| style="text-align:center;" colspan="2"| Career
| 91 || 66 || 27.3 || .470 || .351 || .620 || 4.8 || 3.1 || 1.5 || .6 || 8.9

Professional career

Windy City Bulls (2019–2020)
Simon was not selected in the draft, but was invited to play for the Chicago Bulls' Summer League team. In five games, he averaged 6.8 points and four rebounds in 21 minutes per game. On September 12, 2019, Simon signed an Exhibit 10 contract with the Bulls and was added to the team's training camp roster. On October 21, Simon was waived from the Bulls' roster and was subsequently assigned to the team's G League affiliate, the Windy City Bulls. He averaged 12.8 points per game in the G League.

Illawarra Hawks (2020–2021)
On August 14, 2020, Simon signed a one-year deal with the Illawarra Hawks of the Australian National Basketball League (NBL).

Ratiopharm Ulm (2021)
On August 19, 2021, Simon signed a six-week contract with ratiopharm Ulm of the German Basketball Bundesliga (BBL) as an injury replacement for Karim Jallow.

Riesen Ludwigsburg (2021–2022)
On October 3, 2021, Simon signed with MHP Riesen Ludwigsburg of the BBL. On May 8, 2022, he helped Riesen finish third in the 2021–22 Basketball Champions League when he recorded 27 points, 6 rebounds, 6 assists and 3 steals against Hapoel Holon, becoming the first player in BCL history to record more than 25 points, 5 rebounds, 5 assists and 2 steals. He also set a new record for points in a BCL Final Four game.

Sydney Kings (2022–2023)
On July 18, 2022, Simon signed with the Sydney Kings in Australia for the 2022–23 NBL season.

Scaligera Verona (2023–present)
On March 20, 2023, Simon signed with Scaligera Verona of the LBA.

Personal life
Simon's father Ken played football at Fresno State and his mother Felicia played basketball and ran track at UC Irvine. Simon has two brothers and a sister.

References

External links
 St. John's Red Storm bio
 Sports Reference Profile
 G League Profile

1996 births
Living people
American expatriate basketball people in Australia
American expatriate basketball people in Germany
American men's basketball players
Basketball players from California
Brewster Academy alumni
Illawarra Hawks players
People from Temecula, California
Ratiopharm Ulm players
Riesen Ludwigsburg players
Shooting guards
Sportspeople from Riverside County, California
St. John's Red Storm men's basketball players
Sydney Kings players
Windy City Bulls players